CC19 may refer to:
Botanic Gardens MRT station, an MRT station in Singapore with the code CC19
CubCrafters CC19-180 XCub, an American light aircraft design